The Ben Franklin mesoscaphe, also known as the Grumman/Piccard PX-15, is a crewed underwater submersible, built in 1968. It was the brainchild of explorer and inventor Jacques Piccard. The research vessel was designed to house a six-man crew for up to 30 days of oceanographic study in the depths of the Gulf Stream. NASA became involved, seeing this as an opportunity to study the effects of long-term, continuous close confinement, a useful simulation of long space flights.

The ship was named after American Founding Father Benjamin Franklin.

Design and operation
The Ben Franklin was built between 1966 and 1968 at the Giovanola fabrication plant in Monthey, Switzerland by Piccard and the Grumman Aircraft Engineering Corporation headed by Donald B Terrana, then disassembled and shipped to Florida. The vessel is the first submarine to be built to American Bureau of Shipping (ABS) standards. The 130-ton ship has four external electric propulsion pods, primarily used for altitude trimming. It is powered by tons of lead batteries stored outside the hull. Piccard insisted on 29 observation portholes, despite the objections of engineers over the inclusion of potentially fatal weak points.

It began its voyage on July 14, 1969, off Palm Beach, Florida, with Piccard as the mission leader.

After running aground on a reef in 1971, the Ben Franklin was sold to Vancouver businessman John Horton, only to languish for nearly three decades on the North Shore. In December 1999, with a sudden decision to either move or scrap the submersible, it was offered to the Vancouver Maritime Museum. After refurbishment, the submersible was placed in front of the museum.

Crew 
 Jacques Piccard, the senior scientist on board, as well as the designer and engineer of the vessel
 Frank Busby and Kenneth Haigh, Naval Oceanographic Office personnel
 Chester May, NASA scientist in charge of observing the crew
 Don Kazimir, Chief Pilot and a former navy submarine officer
 Erwin Aebersold, an associate of Jacques' and co-pilot to Kazimir

Influence 
Ambient artists Mathieu Ruhlmann and Celer collaboratively released an album called Mesoscaphe in 2008 dedicated to the voyage of the Ben Franklin.

See also
 SeaOrbiter, a proposed drifting oceanographic research laboratory also associated with Piccard

References

External links 

The Ben Franklin - Grumman/Piccard PX-15 Website
From Sea to Shining Sea: A film treatment documenting the story of the Ben Franklin that was produced as a Discovery Channel Special
Ben Franklin: Captain's Log

Research submarines of Switzerland
Human analog missions
1968 ships
Submarines of Switzerland
Ships built in Switzerland
Museum ships in Canada
Museum ships in British Columbia
Ships named for Founding Fathers of the United States